Antipodactinidae is a family of sea anemones.

Genera 
The following genera are recognized:

References 

 
Metridioidea
Cnidarian families